The Church of St John the Evangelist is a grade II* listed church in Caldecott, Rutland.

History
The church is in the 13th century Gothic style. The clerestory was built in the 15th century and in 1684 the porch was built.

What remains of the spire can be found to the left of the porch. The spire was struck by lightning in 1797. The church also has a royal coat of arms to Queen Victoria over the chancel. The chancel also has a pair of sedilia.

In the churchyard, to the west of the tower, there is an area with ten table tombs.

Also in the churchyard is the grave of Launcelot Packer, marked by a cross. He was a son of the vicar who had emigrated to Cleveland Heights, Ohio. He wanted to be buried in Caldecott with his parents. When he died in 1937 his body was embalmed, placed in a copper coffin, costing £400, and sent to England. He lay in the church so villagers could see him the night before he was buried.

References

Church of England church buildings in Rutland
Grade II* listed churches in Rutland